NGC 6221 (also known as PGC 59175) is a barred spiral galaxy located in the constellation Ara. In de Vaucouleurs' galaxy morphological classification scheme, it is classified as SB(s)bc and was discovered by British astronomer John Herschel on 3 May 1835. NGC 6221 is located at about 69 million light years from Earth.

In 1990, a type Ib/Ic supernova was detected within NGC 6221, and was designated SN 1990W.

Galaxy group information 
NGC 6221 is part of galaxy group NGC 6221/15, which includes spiral galaxy NGC 6215 and three dwarf galaxies.

See also 
 List of NGC objects (6001–7000)
 New General Catalogue

References

External links 
 

Barred spiral galaxies
Ara (constellation)
6221
59175